Highway 373 is a very short highway in the Canadian province of Saskatchewan. It runs from Highway 42 to Highway 45/Highway 646 near Birsay.

References

373